A MIDlet is an application that uses the Mobile Information Device Profile (MIDP) of the Connected Limited Device Configuration (CLDC) for the Java ME environment. Typical applications include games running on mobile devices and cell phones which have small graphical displays, simple numeric keypad interfaces and limited network access over HTTP. MIDlet can run on Android devices via the J2ME Loader emulator application.

The .jad file describing a MIDlet suite is used to deploy the applications in one of two ways. Over the air (OTA) deployment involves uploading the .jad and .jar files to a Web server which is accessible by the device over HTTP. The user downloads the .jad file and installs the MIDlets they require. Local deployment requires that the MIDlet files be transferred to the device over a non-network connection (such as through Bluetooth or IrDa, and may involve device-specific software). Phones that support microSD cards can sometimes install .jar or .jad files that have been transferred to the memory card.

Restrictions
Unlike a Java applet, a MIDlet is limited to use of the LCDUI rather than the more familiar widgets of AWT and Swing. There are also restrictions on the size of .jar files and the number of concurrent HTTP connections based on the MIDP specification.

See also

 Mobile Information Device Profile
 Connected Limited Device Configuration

References

Java device platform
Mobile software programming tools